Texadina is a genus of very small aquatic snails, operculate gastropod mollusks in the family Cochliopidae.

Species
Species within the genus Texadina include:

Texadina barretti (Morrison, 1965)
Texadina sphinctostoma  (Abbott & Ladd, 1951)

References

Cochliopidae